The Muslim Students Federation (M.S. F.) is the student wing of Indian Union Muslim League party in India. 

Muslim Students Federation is principally active in Indian university and college campuses. P.V Ahmed Saju and S. H. Muhammed Arshad currently serves as the National President and National General Secretary of the Muslim Students Federation. 

Muslim Students Federation is the largest Muslim students organisation in Kerala. Indian Union Muslim League leaders C. H. Mohammed Koya, Minister of Education in various Kerala Governments and E. Ahamed, Union Minister of State, Ministry of External Affairs, were associated with the Muslim Students Federation.

National Office bearers

Notable former members 
 C. H. Mohammed Koya, former Chief Minister in Kerala
 E. Ahamed, former Union Minister of State, Ministry of External Affairs
 P. K. Kunhalikutty, former Minister for Industries in Kerala
 E. T. Mohammed Basheer, former Minister of Education in Kerala
 K. M. Kader Mohideen, national President Indian Union Muslim League, Former Member of Parliament (Lok Sabha)

Union 
Students' Federation of India
Kerala Students Union
Kerala State Muslim Students Federation

References

Student organisations in India
1948 establishments in India
Student organizations established in 1948
Indian Union Muslim League
Volunteer organisations in India
Student wings of conservative parties
Youth wings of conservative parties